The 1970–71 Greek Football Cup was the 29th edition of the Greek Football Cup. The competition culminated with the Greek Cup Final, held at Karaiskakis Stadium, on 9 June 1971. The match was contested by Olympiacos and PAOK, with Olympiacos winning by 3–1.

Calendar

Qualification round
From the Sixth Round onwards:

Sixth Round

|}

*The match was interrupted in the expense of EPA Larnaca while the score was 2–1. That remained as the final score

• The last 16 of the previous season's Cup qualified for the 2nd round.

Knockout phase
In the knockout phase, teams play against each other over a single match. If the match ends up as a draw, extra time will be played. If a winner doesn't occur after the extra time the winner emerges by penalty shoot-out.The mechanism of the draws for each round is as follows:
In the draw for the round of 32, the teams that had qualified to previous' season Round of 16 are seeded and the clubs that passed the qualification round are unseeded.
In the draws for the round of 16 onwards, there are no seedings, and teams from the same group can be drawn against each other.

Bracket

Round of 32

|}

Round of 16

|}

Quarter-finals

|}

Semi-finals

|}

Final

The 27th Greek Cup Final was played at the Karaiskakis Stadium.

References

External links
Greek Cup 1970-71 at RSSSF

Greek Football Cup seasons
Greek Cup
Cup